The Archdiocese of Newark is a Latin Church ecclesiastical jurisdiction or archdiocese of the Catholic Church in northeastern New Jersey, United States. Its ecclesiastic territory includes all of the Catholic parishes and schools in the New Jersey counties of Bergen, Union, Hudson and Essex (where the city of Newark is located).

The Archbishop of Newark presides from the Cathedral Basilica of the Sacred Heart in Newark. He is metropolitan for all the New Jersey dioceses. The Archdiocese of Newark is a metropolitan see with the four suffragan sees of the ecclesiastical province being the Diocese of Camden, the Diocese of Metuchen, the Diocese of Paterson and the Diocese of Trenton.

History

Background
As early as 1672 the records show that there were Catholics at Woodbridge and at Elizabethtown, and the Jesuit Fathers Harvey and Gage, Governor Dongan's chaplains in New York, visited them. Other priests came at a later period. Several of these pioneers were Alsatians who had come over with Carteret to engage in the salt-making industry. William Douglass, elected from Bergen, was excluded from the first General Assembly held at Elizabethtown, 26 May 1668, because he was a Catholic. Two years later he was arrested and banished to New England as a "troublesome person". The whole atmosphere of the colony was intensely anti-Catholic. The law of 1698 granted religious toleration in East Jersey, but "provided that this should not extend to any of the Romish religion the right to exercise their manner of worship contrary to the laws and statutes of England". In West Jersey, the pioneers were Quakers and more tolerant. It is claimed that John Tatham, appointed Governor of West Jersey in 1690, and the founder of its pottery industry, was really an English Catholic whose name was John Gray. Father Robert Harding and Father Ferdinand Farmer (Steinmeyer) from the Jesuit community in Philadelphia, made long tours across the State in the eighteenth century ministering to the scattered groups of Catholics at Mount Hope, Macopin, Basking Ridge, Trenton, Ringwood, and other places. The settlement at Macopin (now Echo Lake) was made by some German Catholics sometime before the Revolution.

During the Revolution, the Spanish agent Don Juan de Miralles, died 28 April at Morristown, 1780. Father Seraphin Bandol, chaplain of the French Minister, came specially from Philadelphia to administer the last sacraments. Bandol conducted the funeral and Washington and the other officers attended the ceremony. When in the following May the remains were removed to Philadelphia, Congress attended the Requiem Mass in St. Mary's Church. It was at Morristown in 1780, that the first official recognition of St. Patrick's Day is to be found in Washington's order book. François Barbé-Marbois, writing from Philadelphia, 25 March 1785, gives the number of Catholics in New York and New Jersey as 1700; more than half of these were probably in New Jersey. There were many French refugees from the West Indies in Princeton, Elizabeth, and its vicinity, and Fathers Vianney, Tissorant, and Malou used to minister to them from St. Peter's, New York. Mines, furnaces, glass works, and other industries started in various sections of the State, brought Catholic immigrants.

On November 6, 1789, Pope Pius VI raised the Apostolic Prefecture of the United States, which included what was then the entire United States of America, 
to a diocese and changed its title to Diocese of Baltimore headed by the first American bishop, John Carroll.

On April 8, 1808, Pope Pius VII erected the Diocese of Philadelphia, the Diocese of Boston, the Diocese of Bardstown, and the Diocese of New York, taking their territory from the Diocese of Baltimore.  He simultaneously elevated the Diocese of Baltimore to a metropolitan archdiocese and assigned all four new sees as its suffragans.  At that time, he split the state of New Jersey, assigning Sussex, Bergen, Morris, Essex, Somerset, Middlesex, and Monmouth counties in the northeastern part of the state to the Diocese of New York and the rest of the state to the Diocese of Philadelphia.

The Augustinian Missionary, Father Philip Larisey, visited Paterson about 1821, and the first parish in the State, St. Francis, Trenton, was established in 1814. In New Brunswick the first Mass was said by Rev. Dr. Power of New York in 1825. In Paulus Hook, Mass was first said in 1830. At Macopin a small band of German Catholics had a church as early as 1829. Thus during the first half of the nineteenth century there was a slow but steady growth all over the State. On 29 July 1853, Pope Pius IX erected the Diocese of Newark, taking the territory in New Jersey from both the Diocese of New York and the Diocese of Philadelphia, and thus reuniting the state of New Jersey in a single diocese.

On 2 August 1881, Pope Leo XIII erected the Diocese of Trenton, taking the southern portion of New Jersey from the Diocese of Newark.

Newark's Saint Mary's Abbey was instrumental in the 1889 founding of Saint Anselm College, a Catholic, Benedictine college in Goffstown, New Hampshire.

On 9 December 1937, Pope Pius XI erected the Diocese of Paterson, taking Morris, Sussex, and Passaic counties from the Diocese of Newark, establishing the present territory of the Archdiocese of Newark. On the same day, he erected the Roman Catholic Diocese of Camden, taking the southern portion of New Jersey from the Diocese of Trenton. The next day, he elevated the Diocese of Newark to a metropolitan archdiocese, designating the Diocese of Camden, the Diocese of Paterson, and the Diocese of Trenton as its suffragan sees.

On 19 November 1981, Pope John Paul II erected the Diocese of Metuchen, taking its territory from the Diocese of Trenton and designating it as an additional suffragan see of the Metropolitan Archdiocese of Newark.  This action established the present configuration of the Metropolitan Province of Newark.

On September 24, 2013, Pope Francis appointed Bishop Bernard Hebda, Bishop of Gaylord, Michigan, as Coadjutor Archbishop of Newark, positioning him to succeed Archbishop John J. Myers when the latter retired, resigned, or died. However, after Pope Francis appointed Hebda Apostolic Administrator of Saint Paul and Minneapolis in June 2015, concurrent with Coadjutor Archbishop of Newark, he then named Hebda Archbishop of Saint Paul and Minneapolis on March 24, 2016.

In February 2014, the New York Times reported Archbishop Myers planned to retire to a 7,500-foot "palace" expanded at his direction in Pittstown, New Jersey.

Pope Francis accepted the resignation of Myers on November 7, 2016 and named Cardinal Joseph W. Tobin, then Archbishop of Indianapolis, to be the Archbishop of Newark.  Newark, like Indianapolis, had never before been headed by a cardinal. His installation took place on January 6, 2017.

In September 2021, the Archdiocese broke ground on a new St. Lucy's Homeless Housing & Support Services Site in Jersey City. The project is designed to provide emergency and transitional housing along with supportive services for homeless individuals and families.

Sexual abuse scandal 
In August 2017, the Archdiocese of Newark priest Rev. Kevin Gugilotta received an 11 year prison sentence after pleading guilty to possession of child pornography. In March 2019, it was announced that Gugilotta, was named as a plaintiff in a sex abuse lawsuit which claimed that he committed acts of sex abuse while serving the archdiocese in Union County. It was announced that Gugilotta was removed from ministry in 2016 and the process of defrocking Gugilotta was underway.

A news story stated that in 2014, a priest was removed from his job as rector of St. Andrew's Hall, the archdiocesan college seminary, after it was alleged that he had hidden a camera in a young priest's bedroom.  In response to the story, the Archdiocese of Newark stated that this priest had been "going through a personal crisis and received therapy after the incident at the seminary. Although he is not serving as a pastor, he has been deemed fit for priestly ministry and hopes to serve as a hospital chaplain."

The report by Catholic News Agency, based on interviews with six anonymous priests of the Archdiocese of Newark, gave more details on McCarrick's actions while Archbishop of Newark.  According to this report, one of the priests stated that McCarrick would invite young men to stay at his house on the shore, or to spend the night in the cathedral rectory in central Newark. The six priests alleged sexual misconduct by two priests in seminary and ministry in the archdiocese. The Archdiocese of Newark responded stated neither the six anonymous priests interviewed for the story, nor anyone else, "has ever spoken to Cardinal Tobin about a 'gay sub-culture' in the Archdiocese of Newark." He concluded the letter by encouraging priests to refer media inquiries to the archdiocesan director of communications. This drew criticism such as "The Catholic church's habit of secrecy and denial continues".

In July 2018, it was reported that Catholic dioceses in New Jersey paid two former priests a total of $180,000 after they said Cardinal Theodore McCarrick had sexually abused them. On September 26, 2018, it was announced that Archdiocese of Newark was now one of four American Dioceses facing an investigation by the United States Conference of Catholic Bishops. McCarrick served in each Diocese under investigation.

On February 13, 2019, all of the Catholic Dioceses based in New Jersey released the names of clergy who had been credibly accused of sexually abusing children since 1940. Of the 188 listed, 63 were based in the Archdiocese of Newark. Archbishop Cardinal Joseph Tobin also acknowledged that the alleged acts of abuse committed by the clergy listed were reported to law enforcement agencies. One of the priests also served in the Diocese of Paterson. By 2020, the names of 86 accused clergy who served in Archdiocese of Newark were made public.

In December 2019, a new law went into effect throughout the state of New Jersey which resulted in some of McCarrick's victims filing lawsuits against the former Cardinal and Archdiocese of Newark. As of December 9, 2019, a total of eight lawsuits were filed against the archdiocese, with one also being filed against the Vatican.

On December 27, 2019, the Washington Post revealed that McCarrick gave $600,000 to high-ranking church officials, including two popes, multiple priests, cardinals and archbishops, when he was Archbishop of Washington between 2001 and 2006 amid a sexual abuse probe. The Post article stated that "Several of the more than 100 recipients were directly involved in assessing misconduct claims against McCarrick, documents and interviews show." However, some of these recipients, including both Pope John Paul II and Pope Benedict XVI, had little oversight over these transactions. Robert Hoatson, a former Newark cleric who dropped out of the race for governor, described these payments as "hush money."

By February 9, 2020, the five Catholic dioceses in the state of New Jersey, including the Archdiocese of Newark, had paid a total of over $11 million to compensate 105 claims of sex abuse committed by Catholic clergy. Of these 105 claims, 98 were compensated through settlements. The payments also do not involve 459 other sex abuse cases in these dioceses which are still not resolved. The same month, it was reported that not only the Archdiocese of Newark, but of Diocese of Meutchen and Diocese of Trenton were secretly paying McCarrick's victims since 2005.

On July 13, 2020, it was revealed that nine new sex abuse lawsuits were filed against the Archdiocese of Newark. The new lawsuits allege abuse by four archdiocese priests and three members of religious orders, including one cleric who had not been publicly accused of abuse before the lawsuit was made public. On July 23, 2020, it was revealed that a new lawsuit which had been filed against the Archdiocese of Newark, Diocese of Metuchen and Catholic schools an alleged victim attended claimed that a beach house which McCarrick owned served as common places priests and others under the control of McCarrick engaged in “open and obvious criminal sexual conduct”. The alleged victim maintained that McCarrick abused him with the assistance of other priests beginning in 1982 when he was 14. The lawsuit stated that boys were assigned different rooms in the house and paired with adult clergymen.

On September 9, 2020, a new lawsuit was filed which that in 1997, the Archdiocese of Newark purchased one of two beach houses which then Archbishop McCarrick owned when he was serving as Bishop of the Diocese of Metuchen and alleged that the house was in fact previously used as a sex abuse ring. The Archdiocese of Newark was also revealed to have purchased and sold another beach house which McCarrick previously owned. and was also accused of using as a sex abuse ring, months before purchasing the second beach.

On August 12, 2020, it was revealed that two former male students, who ages ranged from 14 to 15 at the time, were suing the Archdiocese of Newark's Paramus Catholic High School, alleging that the school's former hockey coach Bernard Garris molested them numerous times on school grounds and while on school-sanctioned athletic trips between 1986 and 1988, The lawsuit also alleged that Archdiocese of Newark, the school and Archbishop McCarrick had covered up the abuse after it was reported as well. On October 9, 2020, eight more former Paramus students filed lawsuits accusing Garris of sexually abusing them. On December 1, 2020, it was revealed that the Archdiocese of Newark was among more than 230 sex abuse lawsuits filed within a period of one year against New Jersey Catholic Dioceses.

On December 14, 2020, Archdiocese of Newark priest Rev. Miroslaw Krol, who serves as head of Michigan's Lake Orchards Schools, was named in a lawsuit which accused him of sexually abusing male employees who worked at the school, which consists of a SS. Cyril and Methodius Seminary, Orchard Lake St. Mary’s High School and a Polish cultural center. Despite working in Michigan, Krol still answered directly to the Archdiocese of Newark.

In May 11, 2021, a $50 million lawsuit was filed by a woman alleging that former Newark ArchBishop Leo Gerety sexually abused her in the church rectory in 1976 when she was five years old. In September 2021, four former Archdiocese of Newark priests were named in new sex abuse lawsuits which were filed against the Archdiocese. In November 2021, a lawsuit was against the Archdiocese of Newark by Michael Reading, an ordained who alleged he sexually abused by McCarrick in 1986, the year McCarrick ordained him as a priest. Reading also claimed that as a boy, he was sexually abused in 1978 by Father Edward Eilert, a priest employed by the Archdiocese of Newark.

Present day
As of 2021, the Archdiocese of Newark serves approximately 1.3 million Catholics in 212 parishes throughout the counties of Bergen, Essex, Hudson, and Union. Jersey Catholic is the archdiocesan newspaper. The Catholic Committee on Scouting (CCOS) for the Archdiocese of Newark offers support for Catholic Scouting Units chartered with Archdiocesan Parishes and Schools.

Churches

Bishops

Bishops of Newark
 James Roosevelt Bayley (1853–1872), appointed Archbishop of Baltimore
 Michael Corrigan (1873–1880), appointed Coadjutor Archbishop of New York and subsequently succeeded to that see
 Winand Wigger (1881–1901)
 John J. O'Connor (1901–1927)
 Thomas J. Walsh (1928–1937), elevated to archbishop

Archbishops of Newark
 Thomas J. Walsh (1937–1952)
 Thomas Aloysius Boland (1953–1974)
 Peter Leo Gerety (1974–1986)
 Theodore Edgar McCarrick (1986–2000), appointed Archbishop of Washington
 John J. Myers (2001–2016)  - Bernard Hebda (coadjutor archbishop 2013–2016; concurrently Apostolic Administrator of the Archdiocese of St. Paul and Minneapolis 2015–2016), appointed Archbishop of St. Paul and Minneapolis
 Cardinal Joseph William Tobin, C.Ss.R. (2017–present)

Current auxiliary bishops
 Manuel Aurelio Cruz (2008–present)
 Elias R. Lorenzo, OSB (2020–present)
 Michael A. Saporito (2020–present)
 Gregory J. Studerus (2020–present)

Former auxiliary bishops
 Thomas H. McLaughlin (1935–1937), appointed Bishop of Paterson
 William A. Griffin (1938–1940), appointed Bishop of Trenton
 Thomas Aloysius Boland (1940–1947), appointed Bishop of Paterson and later Archbishop of Newark
 Justin J. McCarthy (1954–1957), appointed Bishop of Camden
 Martin Walter Stanton (1957–1972)
 Joseph Arthur Costello (1963–1978)
 John Joseph Dougherty (1963–1982)
 Jerome Arthur Pechillo, TOR (1976–1991)
 Joseph Abel Francis, SVD (1976–1995)
 Robert Francis Garner (1976–1995)
 Dominic Anthony Marconi (1976–2002)
 David Arias Pérez, OAR (1983–2004)
 James T. McHugh (1987–1989), appointed Bishop of Camden and later Coadjutor Bishop and Bishop of Rockville Centre
 John Mortimer Smith (1988–1991), appointed Bishop of Pensacola-Tallahassee and later Coadjutor Bishop and Bishop of Trenton
 Michael Saltarelli (1990–1995), appointed Bishop of Wilmington
 Charles James McDonnell (1994–2004)
 Nicholas Anthony DiMarzio (1996–1999), appointed Bishop of Camden and later Bishop of Brooklyn
 Paul Gregory Bootkoski (1997–2002), appointed Bishop of Metuchen
 Arthur Serratelli (2000–2004), appointed Bishop of Paterson
 Edgar Moreira da Cunha, SDV (2003–2014), appointed Bishop of Fall River
 Gaetano Aldo Donato (2004–2015)
 John Walter Flesey (2004–2017)

Other priests of this diocese who became bishops
 Robert Seton, appointed titular archbishop of Heliopolis in Phoenicia in 1903
 Peter Baldacchino, appointed auxiliary bishop of Miami in 2014, later became Bishop of Las Cruces

Schools
On May 7, 2020, the Archdiocese of Newark released a statement revealing that ten of its schools –  nine elementary and the Cristo Rey Newark High School – would permanently close at the end of academic year due to heavy financial strains. The statement released by the Archdiocese of Newark also noted that the archdiocese would have to pay approximately $80 million in order to keep all of its remaining elementary schools open for only five more years.

Seminaries
Immaculate Conception (Archdiocesan Major Seminary) at Seton Hall University in South Orange
Saint Andrew's Hall College Seminary at Seton Hall University in South Orange
Redemptoris Mater Archdiocesan Missionary Seminary in Kearny, New Jersey

Higher education
Seton Hall University
 Caldwell College
 Felician College
 Saint Peter's University

Primary and secondary schools

High schools are listed here:

Bergen County
Academy of the Holy Angels (Demarest)
 Bergen Catholic High School (Oradell)
 Don Bosco Preparatory High School (Ramsey)
 Immaculate Conception High School (Lodi)
 Immaculate Heart Academy (Washington Township)
 Paramus Catholic High School (Paramus)
 Queen of Peace High School (North Arlington) (closed 2017)
 St. Joseph Regional High School (Montvale)
 St. Mary High School (Rutherford)

Essex County
Christ the King Preparatory School (Newark) (Closed 2020)
 Immaculate Conception High School (Montclair)
 Lacordaire Academy (Upper Montclair)
 Mount Saint Dominic Academy (Caldwell)
 St. Benedict's Preparatory School (Newark)
 St. Vincent Academy (Newark)
 Seton Hall Preparatory School (West Orange)

Hudson County
 Holy Family Academy (Bayonne)  (CLOSED)
 Hudson Catholic Regional High School (Jersey City)
 Marist High School (Bayonne) (closed 2020)
 St. Anthony High School (Jersey City) -- closed 2017
 St. Dominic Academy (Jersey City)
 St. Peter's Preparatory School (Jersey City)
 Kenmare High School* (Jersey City)
 * Alternative school financially independent of archdiocese.

Union County
 Benedictine Academy (Elizabeth) (closed 2020)
 Mother Seton Regional High School (Clark)
 Oak Knoll School of the Holy Child (Summit)
 Oratory Preparatory School (Summit)
 Roselle Catholic High School (Roselle)
 St. Mary of the Assumption High School (Elizabeth) (closed 2019)
 Union Catholic Regional High School (Scotch Plains)

Cemeteries
Christ The King Cemetery, Franklin Lakes
 Gate of Heaven Cemetery, East Hanover
 Holy Cross Cemetery, North Arlington
 Holy Name Cemetery, Jersey City
 Holy Sepulchre Cemetery, East Orange
 Madonna Cemetery, Fort Lee
 Maryrest Cemetery, Mahwah
 Saint Gertrude's Cemetery, Colonia
 Saint Joseph's Cemetery, Lyndhurst

Parishes of the Archdiocese of Newark

See parishes by location and county here: List of parishes at the Archdiocese of Newark website

Province of Newark

See also

LT John P. Washington, Chaplain, USA – one of the Four Chaplains killed during World War II
Major Charles J. Watters, Chaplain, USA – killed in Vietnam War; awarded the Medal of Honor posthumously
Byzantine Catholic Eparchy of Passaic
Syrian Catholic Eparchy of Our Lady of Deliverance of Newark
List of the Catholic cathedrals of the United States
List of the Catholic dioceses of the United States
Plenary Councils of Baltimore
Catholic Church in the United States
Catholic Church and politics in the United States
History of Roman Catholicism in the United States

References

External links

Roman Catholic Archdiocese of Newark Official Site
 Search for burials in the Archdiocese of Newark database
New Jersey Provincial Directory

 
Religious organizations established in 1853
Newark
Newark
1853 establishments in New Jersey